The Corpus Christi-Kingsville-Alice Combined Statistical Area is made up of six counties in South Texas. The statistical area consists of the Corpus Christi Metropolitan Statistical Area, the Kingsville Micropolitan Statistical Area, and the Alice Micropolitan Statistical Area. As of the 2010 census, the CSA had a population of 501,500 (though a July 1, 2013 estimate placed the population at 516,793).

Counties
Aransas
Kenedy
Kleberg
Nueces
San Patricio
Jim Wells

Communities

Places with more than 200,000 people
Corpus Christi (Principal City)

Places with 10,000 to 30,000 people
Kingsville (Principal City)
Alice (Principal City)
Portland
Robstown
Rockport

Places with 1,000 to 10,000 people
Aransas Pass
Bishop
Fulton
Gregory
Ingleside
Mathis
Odem
Port Aransas
Sinton
Taft Southwest
Taft
San Diego
Premont
Orange Grove

Places with 500 to 1,000 people
Del Sol-Loma Linda
Driscoll
Ingleside on the Bay
Lake City
Lakeshore Gardens-Hidden Acres
North San Pedro
Petronila
St. Paul
Spring Garden-Terra Verde

Places with less than 500 people
Agua Dulce
Doyle
Edgewater-Paisano
Edroy
Falman-County Acres
La Paloma-Lost Creek
Lakeside
Morgan Farm Area
Rancho Banquete
Rancho Chico
San Patricio
Sandy Hollow-Escondidas
Tierra Grande
Tradewinds
Pernitas Point
Ben Bolt

Unincorporated places
Riviera 
Sarita
Alfred-South La Paloma
Alfred
Alice Acres
Ben Bolt
Bentonville
Casa Blanca
Coyote Acres
K-Bar Ranch
La Gloria
Loma Linda East
Owl Ranch-Amargosa
Palito Blanco
Rancho Alegre
Rancho de la Parita
Sandia
Springfield
Westdale
San Federico de la Corrazo

See also
List of cities in Texas
Texas census statistical areas
List of Texas metropolitan areas

References

Geography of Kleberg County, Texas
Geography of Kenedy County, Texas
Geography of Nueces County, Texas
Geography of San Patricio County, Texas
Geography of Aransas County, Texas
Combined statistical areas of the United States